Jinx, stylized as J!NX, is a San Diego, California-based clothing line started by Sean Gailey and Tim Norris in 1999 that creates video game-themed apparel.

Early history
Jinx was started as a home business in 1999 by web developers Sean Gailey and Tim Norris. The company remained a side-project of the two founders until 2003, when they partnered with Jason Kraus and decided to work full-time, using video game themes for the majority of their pieces. The following year the company moved out of Gailey's bedroom and into their first office. Gailey describes the multiple themes that Jinx uses in its apparel as including, "video games, art, geek culture, Internet memes, giant robots, gadgets and comics."

Jinx Clothing and Website
Jinx has produced multiple official product lines, including products licensed to Blizzard Entertainment Minecraft, and Star Wars. The company hires gamers as its employees in order to remain closely linked to the video gaming community. and hosts an online community

Closure
In early November, 2022, Jinx announced the closure of its online website after 23 years in business. On January 1, 2023, Jinx.com took down their online store and replaced it with a splash page containing a "thank you" video and message from Jinx.com CEO Sean Gailey.

References

External links
 Homepage

Clothing manufacturers
Video game culture
Video game websites
Companies based in San Diego
Clothing companies established in 1999
American companies established in 1999
1999 establishments in California